"Deep" is a song by British boy band East 17. Written by band member Tony Mortimer, it was released on 18 January 1993 as the third single from the band's debut album, Walthamstow (1993). The song became their first top-five hit in the UK, charting at number five on the UK Singles Chart. Following the lackluster commercial performance of previous single "Gold", "Deep" returned the band to several international music charts, making it to the top 10 also in Australia, Ireland, Sweden and Zimbabwe, as well as becoming a number one hit in Israel. It is the band's only single to appear on the main Billboard chart in the United States, peaking at number 23 on the Bubbling Under Hot 100 in September 1993.

Critical reception
Larry Flick from Billboard wrote that "shuffling, hip-hop-lite beats groove along at a pleasing clip, while harmless rapping and layers of harmony cover the bases of top 40's fave sounds of the moment. It may sound completely formulaic and sugary, but it works incredibly well. Besides, not every song is meant to change the world. Sometimes, a little ear-candy is in order." Adam Sweeting from The Guardian remarked that "this happening dance-pop combo are currently luxuriating in chart glory with the atmospheric "Deep", though the song is hardly typical." A reviewer from Music & Media felt the "slow rap not unlike L.L. Cool J's standard "I Need Love" is a fairly inventive piece of music." 

Alan Jones from Music Week named it Pick of the Week, commenting, "After their high octane hit "House of Love", it's something of a surprise to hear East 17 adopt a shuffle beat, as they do here, for a much less frenetic deadpan rap, punctuated by a melodic chorus, some pretty piano runs and chiming strings. A hit of some magnitude." Jeff Silberman from The Network Forty described it as "a smooth pop/funk ditty with spoken-rap vocals and sweet harmonies. This song is funky enough for crossover, yet polished and melodic enough for the mainstream. An inviting debut from their first album, Walthamstow." Another editor, Wendi Cermak, noted that "down-tempo and smooth, this jam comes off fresh. With a sound something like PM Dawn, this tune is sure to please." Neil Spencer from The Observer remarked that "with sly sexuality", the band showed "surprisingly clever songwriting." Johnny Lee from Smash Hits gave it five out of five and named it Best New Single, writing that "the tykes from the 'Stow launch into the '93 with a groove so slinky it's almost obscene. Tony purrs his rap - "how much I can touch/How much and where" - in slo-mo mystical fashion. Plus it's got the most squishy chorus ever."

Music video
The official music video for "Deep" uses intercut clips of the band performing the track in various locations whilst hanging out and playing pool in their local area. It was directed by Richard Heslop.

Track listings

 UK and Australian CD single
 "Deep" (Breath mix)
 "Deep" (Penetration mix)
 "Deep" (Throat mix)
 "Deep" (Down)

 UK limited-edition CD single
 "Deep" (Depth mix)
 "House of Love" (Wet Nose dub)
 "Gold" (Paws on the Floor)
 "Deep" (Meaning)

 UK 7-inch and cassette single, European CD single
 "Deep" (Breath mix)
 "Deep" (Depth mix)

 French CD single
 "Deep" (remix) – 3:10
 "Deep" (Penetration mix) – 4:52

 US 12-inch single
A1. "Deep" (Penetration mix) – 4:52
A2. "Deep" (Meaning) – 4:06
B1. "Deep" (Down) – 4:39
B2. "Deep" (Throat mix) – 6:16

 US cassette single
A1. "Deep" (Breath mix) – 3:59
A2. Special previews ("House of Love"/"Slow It Down"/"West End Girls")
B1. "I Disagree" – 4:57
B2. Special previews ("House of Love"/"Slow It Down"/"West End Girls")

Charts

Weekly charts

Year-end charts

Certifications

References

1992 songs
1993 singles
East 17 songs
London Records singles
Music videos directed by Richard Heslop
Number-one singles in Israel
Songs written by Tony Mortimer